Lindstrom Ridge is a ridge on the west side of Green Glacier in the Darwin Mountains of Antarctica. It is named after Marilyn Lindstrom, curator of Antarctic meteorites at the NASA Johnson Space Center, Houston, Texas, for many years up to 2000.

References

Ridges of Oates Land